Aenictus porizonoides is a species of reddish brown army ant found in Sri Lanka.

References

 https://www.itis.gov/servlet/SingleRpt/SingleRpt?search_topic=TSN&search_value=574311

External links

 at antwiki.org

Dorylinae
Hymenoptera of Asia
Insects described in 1860